Lygos, also spelled Ligos, is one of the ancient names of Istanbul.

It may also refer to:
 Lygkos, a mountain range in Greece
 An obsolete name for the botanical genus Retama